744 Naval Air Squadron (744 NAS) is a Naval Air Squadron of the Royal Navy's Fleet Air Arm. It was initially active in 1943, based in Nova Scotia. A second 744 NAS was formed, in early 1944, in Northern Ireland, for Merchant Aircraft Carrier training, meaning the first iteration was re-designated 754 NAS. The squadron's primary focus turned to Anti-submarine warfare training, which then further developed into trialing new submarine detection technology, ending in 1956. In 2018 it reformed as the Mission Systems and Armament Test and Evaluation Squadron.

History of 744 NAS

Air Gunner Training Squadron (1943 - 1944) 

However, as part of the British Commonwealth Air Training Plan, the squadron moved to RN Air Section Yarmouth, located in Yarmouth County, Nova Scotia, Canada, almost straight away. It was equipped with Curtiss SO3C Seamew aircraft. Fifteen months later, in June 1944, the squadron was re-designated as 754 Naval Air Squadron.

Merchant Aircraft Carrier and Anti-Submarine training (1944 - 1947) 
A detachment, working out of RNAS Machrihanish (HMS Landrail), close to Campbeltown in Argyll and Bute, Scotland, trained crews for 836 NAS, including providing Anti-submarine warfare (ASW) training. 744 NAS swapped its Swordfish for Barracuda and briefly, Firefly aircraft.

Anti-Submarine Trials and Development Unit (1951 - 1956) 
It reformed on 20 July 1951, from 737 Squadron X Flight, as an anti-submarine trials and development unit at RNAS Eglinton (HMS Gannet) and continued in this role until 31 October 1956 when it was disbanded. The squadron was engaged with trials to support the development of search receivers, which were designed to detect submarine radar. A Fairey Barracuda ASV Mk.XI underwent a conversion for trial purposes, this was known as ‘Investigation Pointer’. It was also involved with Orange Harvest, which was subsequently fitted to the RAF’s maritime patrol Avro Shackletons. A detachment went to RNAS Hal Far, Malta, in October 1951 following two Fairey Fireflies being fitted with a homing device that could detect sonobuoys, therefore removing the need for smoke markers, for subsequent trials with submarines and ships, from successive initial trials at Farnborough.

Additionally the squadron took on Search and Rescue duties from December 1952, using Dragonfly HR.3 helicopters, although this role ended on disbandment at Eglinton. By 1953, 744 NAS also operated as the Station Flight, but again this ended on disbandment, which took place on 1 March 1954. However, on the same day, the squadron reformed at RNAS Culdrose (HMS Seahawk), located near Helston, Cornwall, as a Naval fixed wing anti-submarine warfare development unit (ASWDU), remaining there until the October where it relocated to RAF St Mawgan, near St Mawgan and Newquay, in Cornwall. Here, the squadron was initially equipped with Firefly AS.6 aircraft on reformation and these were later followed by Fairey Gannet, which arrived in May 1955. Two months later, the squadron received Grumman Avengers and the Firefly were withdrawn later in the year. Two years on from arriving in St Mawgan, the squadron disbanded on 31 October 1956.

Mission Systems and Armament Test and Evaluation Sqn (2018 - ) 
On 14 November 2018, the squadron was reformed, at MoD Boscombe Down, on the southeastern outskirts of the town of Amesbury, Wiltshire, its initial role was to introduce the Crowesnest Airborne Early Warning Merlin Mk2 aircraft and the RAF's Chinook Mk5s and Mk6s. It was positioned as a joint unit under the Air Warfare Centre's, as the Mission Systems and Armament Test and Evaluation Squadron.

Current role

744 Naval Air Squadron is based at MoD Boscombe Down, as part of the Air and Space Warfare Centre, forming part of the Air Test and Evaluation Centre. Its primary role is the evaluating and testing of any new and existing helicopters and fixed-wing aircraft, including their avionics and weapons.

The squadron is tasked with skilling up to provide support to the Future Combat Air System, Tempest and RAF Typhoon aircraft development work. It will also provide support to the Merlin HM2 Crowsnest airborne early warning programme and support any future Testing and Evaluation programmes for the Merlin HC4/4A, the Wildcat HMA2 and the Wildcat AH1 helicopters. Support to various weapons integration programmes will be provided, and with the initial Air and Space Warfare Centre's focus also including the Testing and Evaluation of electronic warfare and combat air systems, it will develop a modelling and simulation strategy.

The Future Anti-Surface Guided Weapons (FASGW) programme for the Wildcat helicopter has been a major objective for 744 NAS, relating to the successful development of the lightweight Martlet missile and the Sea Venom Anti-ship missile.

The squadron is also participating with the Merlin Mid-Life Sustainment Programme (MLSP) which is a continuous improvement programme for the Royal Navy’s Merlin HM2 and HC4/4A helicopters.

Aircraft flown

The squadron has flown or operated with a number of different aircraft types, including:
Curtiss SO3C Seamew
Fairey Swordfish
Fairey Barracuda
Fairey Firefly
Avro Anson
Airspeed Oxford
Supermarine Seafire F Mk III
Westland WS-51 Dragonfly
Supermarine Sea Otter
de Havilland Dominie
Hunting Percival Sea Prince
Fairey Gannet
Grumman TBF Avenger
AgustaWestland Merlin HM2
Chinook HC5/HC6

Fleet Air Arm / Royal Air Force Bases 
744 NAS operated from a number of air bases:
Royal Naval Air Station LEE-ON-SOLENT (10 February 1943 - 1 March 1943)
R.N. Air Section YARMOUTH (1 March 1943 - 1 June 1944)
Royal Naval Air Station MAYDOWN (6 March 1944 - 29 September 1945)
Royal Naval Air Station EGLINTON (29 September 1945 - 1 December 1947)
Royal Naval Air Station EGLINTON (20 July 1951 - 1 March 1954)
Royal Naval Air Station CULDROSE (1 March 1954 - 22 October 1954)
Royal Air Force Station St Mawgan (22 October 1954 - 31 October 1956)
MoD BOSCOMBE DOWN (14 November 2018 - present)

References

Bibliography

700 series Fleet Air Arm squadrons
Military units and formations established in 1943
Military units and formations of the Royal Navy in World War II